Tramore Athletic F.C. is an Irish association football club based in Douglas, County Cork. Their senior men's team currently plays in the Munster Senior League. The club has previously played in the Cork Athletic Union League. They have also entered teams in the FAI Cup, the FAI Intermediate Cup, the FAI Youth Cup and the Munster Senior Cup

History
Tramore Athletic F.C. was formed in 1948 following a split within Evergreen United. This split resulted in the majority of the youth players breaking away from Evergreen to form Tramore Athletic. The club was founded following a meeting at the O'Connell's Corner House Pub in Turners Cross. Its founding members came from Turners Cross, Douglas and Blackrock and as a result it took its name from the Tramore River which passed through the three communities. The club started out as a schoolboy club and shortly after its formation, Tramore Athletic became founding members of the Cork Schoolboys League. They won their first ever trophy in 1954 after winning an under–14 league title. Tramore Athletic also joined the Cork Athletic Union League and in 1956–57 and 1957–58 won the league's third level and second level division titles in successive seasons. 1957–58 also saw the club come to national prominence for the first time when they won the FAI Youth Cup after defeating Johnville 2–0 in the final at Turners Cross. Encouraged by this national success Tramore Athletic entered a team in the Munster Senior League for the first time in 1959. Over subsequent decades Tramore Athletic enjoyed success at both provincial and national levels, winning four Munster Senior League Senior Premier Division titles and contesting seven FAI Intermediate Cup finals. They have also won the FAI Youth Cup on two further occasions. Dave Barry and Kieran O'Regan both featured in the side which beat Home Farm in 1979–80. O'Regan also scored in the 3–0 win over Athlone Town in 1981–82. In addition to regularly competing in the FAI Youth Cup and FAI Intermediate Cup, Tramore Athletic have also occasionally competed in the FAI Cup.

Notable former players
Republic of Ireland international
  Kieran O'Regan
Republic of Ireland U23 international
  Graham Cummins
League of Ireland XI representatives
  Dave Barry
  Donal Leahy
League of Ireland manager
  Noel O'Mahony
Cork inter-county Gaelic footballers
  Dave Barry
  Derek Kavanagh

Honours
Munster Senior League
Winners: 1966–67, 1973–74, 1988–89, 1989–90: 4
Runners-up: 1967–68, 1974–75, 1979–80, 1983–84, 1984–85, 1987–88: 6
FAI Intermediate Cup
Winners: 1978–79, 1980–81, 1986–87: 3
Runners-up: 1966–67, 1979–80, 1981–82, 1987–88: 4
FAI Youth Cup
Winners: 1957–58, 1979–80, 1981–82: 3
Runners-up: 1961–62, 1976–77: 2
Munster Senior Cup
Runners-up: 1980–81, 1989–90: 2

References

External links
 Tramore Athletic on Facebook

Association football clubs in County Cork
1948 establishments in Ireland
Munster Senior League (association football) clubs
Association football clubs in Cork (city)
Former Cork Athletic Union League clubs
Association football clubs established in 1948